The Cadfael Chronicles is a series of historical murder mysteries written by the linguist-scholar Edith Pargeter (1913–1995) under the name "Ellis Peters".

Set in the 12th century during the Anarchy in England, the novels focus on a Benedictine monk, Cadfael, who aids the law by investigating and solving murders.

In all, Pargeter wrote twenty Cadfael novels between 1977 and 1994. Each draws on the storyline, characters and developments of the previous books in the series. Pargeter apparently planned the 20th novel, Brother Cadfael's Penance, as the final book of the series, and it brings together the loose story ends into a tidy conclusion. Pargeter herself died shortly after its publication, following a long illness. Many of the books have been adapted as both radio episodes, in which Ray Smith, Glyn Houston and subsequently Philip Madoc played the monk, and a television series starring Derek Jacobi as Cadfael.

Pargeter's Cadfael Chronicles are sometimes credited for popularizing a genre known as the historical mystery novel.

Brother Cadfael

Unlike many monks who entered the monastery as children, Cadfael is a conversus, having entered the cloister in his forties after being both a soldier and a sailor. His experiences have given him an array of talents and skills useful in monastic life. He is a skilled observer of human nature and a talented herbalist, a skill he learned from Muslims in the Holy Land. He is inquisitive and energetic, and has an innate though obviously modern sense of justice and fair play. Abbots call upon him as a medical examiner, detective, doctor and diplomat. His worldly knowledge, although useful, gets him into trouble with the more doctrinaire characters of the series, and the seeming contradiction between the secular and the spiritual worlds forms a central and continuing theme.

Historical background
The stories are set between 1137 and 1145, during the Anarchy, the destructive contest for the crown of England between King Stephen and Empress Matilda (also known as Empress Maud). Many historical events are described or referred to in the books. For example, the translation of Saint Winifred to Shrewsbury Abbey is fictionalised in the first chronicle, A Morbid Taste for Bones, and One Corpse Too Many is inspired by the siege of Shrewsbury Castle by Stephen in 1138.  The burning of Worcester puts the characters on the run into the countyrside around the town in The Virgin in the Ice.  The pillage of Winchester and the burning of the abbey there sends the monks who are at the centre of the story to Shrewsbury Abbey in An Excellent Mystery.  In Dead Man's Ransom the fictional characters are involved with the small group of Welshmen who take part in the Battle of Lincoln, drawing the historical prince of Gwynedd, Owain, into the plot. Empress Matilda's brief stay in London, when she tried to gain approval for her coronation while she held Stephen in prison, is the starting point for one character in The Pilgrim of Hate.  The next turning of Henry of Blois's coat and the rising fortunes of King Stephen involve the Abbot and send three new people into the Foregate and the Abbey in The Raven in the Foregate.  One main character in The Hermit of Eyton Forest arrives in Shropshire while the Empress is besieged in Oxford Castle. In The Potter's Field Hugh Beringar's force is called to the Fens to aid King Stephen in controlling the rampaging Geoffrey de Mandeville, Earl of Essex; on return the Sheriff doublechecks the story of a character who escaped from that area back to Shropshire.  The quarrel between Owain Gwynedd and his impetuous younger brother Cadwaladr on account of Cadwaladr's murder of the prince of a southern principality in Wales, combined with the push to spread the Roman rite into Wales, are parts of the story told in The Summer of the Danes.

In novels where the plot does not hinge on a historical event or have historical characters walking through the story the focus is on one or two aspects of life in medieval England.  Examples include the importance of pilgrimage in The Heretic's Apprentice, the wool and clothmaking trades in The Rose Rent, the rules of inheritance under Welsh law in Monk's Hood, and specific merchant trades in Saint Peter's Fair and The Sanctuary Sparrow. The annual fair raised funds for the Abbey, authorised by Earl Roger or King Henry I. The use of a house of worship for sanctuary from secular law is also a feature of The Sanctuary Sparrow. Cadfael is an herbalist, whose skills and potions bring him into contact with people outside the monastery, integral in the plots not dependent on a historical event.

The real people portrayed in the series include:
 King Stephen
 Empress Matilda (whom Peters usually calls Empress Maud)
 Robert of Gloucester and his son Philip
 Geoffrey de Mandeville, 1st Earl of Essex
 Robert of Leicester
 Owain Gwynedd, his brother Cadwaladr ap Gruffydd, and his son Hywel
 William of Ypres
 Bishop Henry of Blois
 Bishop Roger de Clinton
 Abbots Heribert (1128–1138), Radolfus (1138–1148) and Robert Pennant (prior to 1148, then abbot to 1168)
 Henry I of England (1068/9–1135)

Themes

Cadfael and love
A distinctive feature of the series is a pair of star-crossed lovers in nearly every book, who invariably get the full sympathy of Brother Cadfael (and the reader). Typically, Cadfael bends his full energy and ingenuity to the double task of solving the mystery and bringing the lovers to a happy union. In this latter, he seems the literary descendant of Shakespeare's Friar Laurence who made great (though ultimately futile) efforts to help Romeo and Juliet. Cadfael is far more successful, with virtually all pairs of lovers in the series getting off to happy consummations, except when one of them turns out to be the wanted murderer. In one case, indeed, the lovers get their happy ending with Cadfael's help, even though one of them is the murderer.

Lovers in the Cadfael books face a whole series of obstacles, which sometimes seem insurmountable (in one book, it seems they are relatives too close to marry) but are invariably overcome. However, the problem is almost never a significant difference in social status between the two. In this series, aristocratic boys usually fall in love with aristocratic girls, artisans fall for the daughters of artisans, and a lowly wandering juggler is charmed beyond measure by a lowly kitchen maid.  In The Hermit of Eyton Forest a prosperous forester's daughter falls in love with a runaway villein, a skilled leatherworker who will work his year and a day to establish himself in his trade in Shropshire before he marries her.  In St. Peter's Fair, a tradesman's daughter settles for another tradesman's son after her aristocratic first choice turns out to be a cad, calling her a "shopkeeper's girl of no account." In most cases, it seems that Pargeter's characters deliberately curtail their romantic aspirations where class conflict would undermine them. There are some exceptions to this class consciousness; in The Virgin in the Ice a noblewoman marries her guardian's favourite squire, though he is the illegitimate son of a footsoldier and a Syrian widow, and in The Pilgrim of Hate an aristocratic youth marries the daughter of a tradesman.

Aristocracy
A passage in The Confession of Brother Haluin introduces a nobleman whom the reader (and Cadfael) had not met before:
Here he came, Audemar de Clary, on a tall chestnut horse, a big man in dark, plain, workmanlike riding clothes, without ornament, and needing none to mark him as having authority here. (...) Not a man to be crossed lightly, but no one feared him. They approached him cheerfully and spoke with him boldly. His anger, when justified, might be withering, even perilous – but it would be just.

This is fairly typical of most members of the aristocracy depicted in the series, who are described as fair-minded and just to their underlings, within the context of the hierarchical feudal social system and ideology.

The books do present some manifestly unjust, tyrannical and or outright cruel members of the aristocracy, though they are definitely in the minority. Faced with such, peasants can and do resort to the "safety-valve" built within the feudal system itself, by escaping from their lord to a chartered borough where after a stay of one year and one day they become free. On several occasions, Cadfael facilitates and helps such escapes.

Also, cruel and unjust landowners may end up as the victims of the murder which Cadfael needs to solve, in which case the reader is curious to know the solution of the mystery, but is not particularly eager to see the perpetrator punished.

Civil war 
The civil war between King Stephen and Empress Maud is a constant background to the series, called the Anarchy by many. Despite the lack of newspapers and other mass news media, the inhabitants of Shrewsbury are kept well informed of the latest developments as the town is a major centre of commerce, constantly getting visitors from all over the country.

In One Corpse Too Many, the second book in the series, Shrewsbury itself is a battlefield, and the wholesale execution of the defeated garrison by order of King Stephen forms the gruesome background to the book's murder mystery.

Further on, however, Shrewsbury is an island of calm in the raging storm. Refugees as well as spies and conspirators constantly come in, considerably impacting life in the town and setting up the plot for many of the books. Characters occasionally set out to the battlefields, either to take direct part in the fighting or (as in the case of Cadfael himself) to offer some needed aid or rescue. Stories of woe and disaster come in from other locations, such as Worcester (The Virgin in the Ice), Lincoln (Dead Man's Ransom) or Winchester (An Excellent Mystery). Moreover, Shrewsbury is in close proximity to the border of Wales, which has its own troubles and wars – distinct from, though often interconnected with, those of England (Dead Man's Ransom). In the last novel, Brother Cadfael's Penance, Cadfael and Sheriff Hugh Beringar start out at a peace conference in Coventry, but Cadfael ends up in the midst of castle under siege, with castellan Philip FitzRobert seriously wounded by a projectile lobbed in by a siege machine.  The castle was not too far from Gloucester, among the ongoing battles in the Thames Valley.

For all that, for most of the series the war happens elsewhere. Hugh Beringar, though in effect assuming the functions of a military governor and civil administrator as well as head of the police, finds the time and energy to personally work with Cadfael on solving a new mystery. Though living in a war-torn country, Cadfael is often seen sitting contented in his garden and reflecting on the harmonic turn of the year's seasons. An Excellent Mystery concludes:September was again September, mellowed and fruitful after the summer heat and drought. After every extreme the seasons righted themselves, and won back the half at least of what was lost.

In general, the war is seen as mainly the concern of the nobility. Some of its members take up a staunch and unwavering loyalty to one side or the other, and opposing partisans treat each other with utmost respect, as prescribed by the code of chivalry. Others are utterly opportunistic and seek only to make use of the situation for personal profit and advancement, and are regarded with contempt by the more principled characters (and seemingly by the writer as well).

The lower classes, burghers and peasants, in general have little interest in who would win the war as long as the death and destruction end, either by one of the contenders winning or by their reaching some kind of compromise (the latter is what the Church is shown as trying to achieve, with little success). In the manorial system they have no share in political power; however, workers on a manor were called up for service as men-at-arms when the need arose (An Excellent Mystery).

The burghers of Shrewsbury are concerned to repair the damage caused to their city during fighting in which they had little interest (the question who would pay for it is an undercurrent in Saint Peter's Fair). Thereafter, the traders and artisans of the city are well-content to live under the reasonably efficient and honest administration offered on behalf of King Stephen by Prestcote and later by Beringar. They might have been equally content to live under the Empress Maud, provided only that her local representatives offer them the same possibility of developing undisturbed their trade and commerce. This cannot be known, as Maud never held Shropshire, nor protected their farms, trade and commerce.

The series ends with the battles ongoing, though it is a stalemate, and the earls and barons began to make their own peace treaties.  There was an effort to bring about a peaceful resolution ending in nought. The fighting ended mainly three years after the last book when Robert of Gloucester died, and Empress Maud returned to Normandy.  A new era opened for England when King Stephen died in 1154, having signed a treaty with his successor, Henry FitzEmpress, eldest son of Maud and her second husband Geoffrey of Anjou. But for the writer's death, the format of the series – chronologically consecutive – might have left room for additional volumes before the end of Stephen's reign was reached. Cadfael would have been in his 70s, and based on actual history, Prior Robert Pennant would have become the Abbot in place of Radulfus, so the last book was perhaps a satisfying close, with Cadfael's personal life expanding, his son safe, and the lack of interest in the ongoing strife growing clear.

Crusades in the background
The Crusades form an important part of the backdrop to the books. There are Cadfael's own memories of his crusading life, which occur in virtually every one of the books, and the circumstances of Olivier's early life. In addition, most of Cadfael's knowledge of herbs and medicine was learned in the East, from more sophisticated sources than he would have found in England. (In the TV version of Virgin in the Ice, when Cadfael is treating a gravely wounded brother, the best remedy another brother can suggest is bleeding, which Cadfael scorns.)

Several of the books feature returning crusaders who have central roles in the plot, while in others there are characters who depart England on the way eastwards. All of these crusading characters are depicted as sterling, model knights, brave and chivalrous, and the crusading enterprise itself is invariably regarded by all characters as a most noble and worthy cause.

There is occasional oblique mention of acts of cruelty committed in the course of the Crusades. In conversation with a fellow crusader, Cadfael remarks, "After the killing that was done in Jerusalem, of so many who held by the Prophet, I say they deserved better luck against us than they had." In adding that his companion was never accused of brutality, he implicitly passes judgment on the Crusades as a whole (The Leper of Saint Giles). While on various occasions Cadfael makes remarks showing him not pleased with such brutalities, the references are rarely specific. Cadfael (as all other characters) never casts any doubt on the morality of carving out a Christian kingdom in the Muslim East and maintaining it by force; indeed, it would have been anachronistic to have him express such doubts.

Cadfael's experience of the Crusades didn't lead to bigotry. Cadfael remembers Mariam, a Muslim woman, as "well worth the loving," and had many other profitable friendships with Arabs and Muslims. His companion from The Leper of Saint Giles, who spent many years as a captive of the Fatimid Egyptians, agrees, saying he always found his hosts "chivalrous and courteous," who gave him medical help and supported him in his convalescence.

Differences between books and television series
Thirteen of the books were adapted for television. They starred Derek Jacobi. The sequence of the television episodes differs from the sequence of the novels. Within the individual screenplays, with one major exception, most are reasonably faithful to the books, being modified primarily to minimise the size of the speaking cast, the running time of the script, or the need for extravagant special effects. Only in the books, Cadfael speaks Welsh and translates for several non-English-speaking Welshmen.

One episode, The Pilgrim of Hate, bears almost no resemblance to the eponymous book save the presence of a few characters sharing the names (but not the actions) of the characters in the book. In The Holy Thief, one of the characters is turned into a villain. In A Morbid Taste For Bones the climax sequence is altered, giving Cadfael more of a speaking role. In the episode Monk's Hood, Hugh has a somewhat larger role than in the book, following Cadfael to the court and suffering a stab wound when he walks in unexpectedly on Cadfael's accusation of the true criminal. In The Rose Rent, Cadfael gives the young wife a potion to ease her terminally ill husband's pain, warning her that too much will kill him; in the next scene, the man is dead, implying a mercy killing. In the book, there is no such implication; the man dies of his illness without any hint that Cadfael or the widow acted to hasten his end.

The character of Hugh Beringar is markedly different in the television series, particularly in his relationship with Cadfael. In the series, Hugh is the sheriff who sometimes helps, and sometimes hinders Cadfael - friendly but maintaining a professional relationship. In the books, despite the more than thirty years difference in their ages, Hugh and Cadfael are best friends who think alike in crucial ways, particularly as to what is justice.

Hugh and Aline Siward are both introduced in One Corpse Too Many. Hugh appears in all of the books except A Morbid Taste for Bones, whilst Aline does not appear in any of the subsequent television episodes. She appears in several of the books, where she plays an important role in sheltering women (Saint Peter's Fair, An Excellent Mystery, One Corpse Too Many, The Sanctuary Sparrow), and even when she does not appear in the books, Hugh speaks of her constantly and fondly. In the books, Hugh marries Aline and they have a son, Giles, named for Aline's dead brother. Cadfael is the godfather of Hugh's son, and he confides several of his deepest secrets only to Hugh.

Bibliography

Cadfael novels 
These are numbered in order of the time in which the novel was set and the order of publication. Each book has been published in hardback and paperback, and in a number of languages. The first publication in the UK, by Macmillan (or Headline Book Publishing, beginning with The Hermit of Eyton Forest), is the year of first publication.

A Rare Benedictine is in the order of publication, but not in the order of setting. That book includes three short stories describing how Cadfael, man-at-arms in the Crusades and Normandy, joined a Benedictine monastery.

 A Morbid Taste for Bones (published in August 1977, set in 1137)
 One Corpse Too Many (July 1979, set in August 1138)
 Monk's Hood (August 1980, set in December 1138)
 Saint Peter's Fair (May 1981, set in July 1139)
 The Leper of Saint Giles (August 1981, set in October 1139)
 The Virgin in the Ice (April 1982, set in November 1139)
 The Sanctuary Sparrow (January 1983, set in the Spring of 1140)
 The Devil's Novice (August 1983, set in September 1140)
 Dead Man's Ransom (April 1984, set in February 1141)
 The Pilgrim of Hate (September 1984, set in May 1141)
 An Excellent Mystery (June 1985, set in August 1141)
 The Raven in the Foregate (February 1986, set in December 1141)
 The Rose Rent (October 1986, set in June 1142)
 The Hermit of Eyton Forest (June 1987, set in October 1142)
 The Confession of Brother Haluin (March 1988, set in December 1142)
 A Rare Benedictine: The Advent of Brother Cadfael (September 1988, set in 1120)
 The Heretic's Apprentice (February 1989, set in June 1143)
 The Potter's Field (September 1989, set in August 1143)
 The Summer of the Danes (April 1991, set in April 1144)
 The Holy Thief (August 1992, set in February 1145)
 Brother Cadfael's Penance (May 1994, set in November 1145)

Note that the numbering of the Brother Cadfael Chronicles as published in paperback by Mysterious Press does not include A Rare Benedictine (instead, the cover refers to it as "The Advent Of Brother Cadfael"); the total of the numbered chronicles (by Mysterious Press) is therefore 20 (per the covers of this set).

All of the novels are also available as audiobooks. Narrators include Vanessa Benjamin (The Devil's Novice from Blackstone Audio), Philip Madoc, Derek Jacobi, Roe Kendall, Stephen Thorne, Patrick Tull and Johanna Ward. The series is also available as e-books from multiple sources, as noted in the publication history for each novel.

The first two novels in the series, along with Cadfael Country: Shropshire and the Welsh Borders, are available as one edition from Mysterious Press.

Seven Cadfael Omnibus editions were published, with three novels in each volume. Most are available as paperbacks, and were later published in hardback.

First Cadfael Omnibus  A Morbid Taste for Bones, One Corpse Too Many, Monk's-Hood (December 1990 Sphere  / 9780751504767 UK edition)
Second Cadfael Omnibus  Saint Peter's Fair, The Leper of Saint Giles, The Virgin in the Ice (October 1991 Sphere  / 9780751507294 UK edition)
Third Cadfael Omnibus  The Sanctuary Sparrow, The Devil's Novice, Dead Man's Ransom (September 1992 Sphere  / 9780751501117 UK edition)
Fourth Cadfael Omnibus  Pilgrim of Hate, An Excellent Mystery, The Raven in the Foregate (September 1993 Sphere  / 9780751503920 UK edition)
Fifth Cadfael Omnibus  The Rose Rent, The Hermit of Eyton Forest, The Confession of Brother Haluin (September 1994 Sphere  / 9780751509496 UK edition)
Sixth Cadfael Omnibus The Heretic's Apprentice, The Potter's Field, The Summer of the Danes (January 1996 Sphere  / 9780751515893 UK edition)
Seventh Cadfael Omnibus The Holy Thief, Brother Cadfael's Penance, A Rare Benedictine (September 1997 Sphere  / 9780751520811 UK edition)

There is also a three books "collection pack set" containing the first three books ("A Morbid Taste for Bones", "One Corpse Too Many" and "Monk's Hood" as separate books.

An omnibus edition published as The Brother Cadfael Mysteries (published by Quality Paperback Book Club, New York, in 1995) contains The Leper of Saint Giles, Monk's Hood, The Sanctuary Sparrow and One Corpse Too Many.

Short stories 
 Published in A Rare Benedictine: The Advent of Brother Cadfael (1988):
 A Light on the Road to Woodstock (set in Autumn 1120)
 The Price of Light (set at Christmas 1135)
 Eye Witness (set in Spring 1140)

Adaptations

Stage
A stage adaptation of The Virgin in the Ice starred Gareth Thomas as Cadfael.

Radio
BBC Radio 4 produced adaptations of several novels in the Cadfael Chronicles with three different actors voicing Cadfael.

Starring Ray Smith as Cadfael: 
1 - A Morbid Taste for Bones (1980) with Steven Pacey as "Brother John"

Starring Glyn Houston as Cadfael:
2 - One Corpse Too Many (1989) with Geoffrey Whitehead as "Adam Courcelles"

Written and produced by Bert Coules and starring Philip Madoc as Cadfael:
3 – Monk's Hood (1991), with Sir Michael Hordern as "The Narrator", Geoffrey Whitehead as "Prior Robert" and Timothy Bateson as "Father Heribert"
6 – The Virgin in the Ice (1992) with Sir Michael Hordern as "The Narrator" and Douglas Hodge as "Hugh Beringar"
9 – Dead Man's Ransom (1995) with Michael Kitchen as "The Narrator", Jonathan Tafler as "Hugh Beringar" and Susannah York as "Sister Magdelen"

Television dramas

Produced in Britain by Central for ITV, 75 minutes per episode. Filmed on location in Hungary and starring Sir Derek Jacobi.
All thirteen episodes have been released on DVD.

Notes

References

Bibliography

External links
 "The world of Brother Cadfael" Logos: A Journal of Catholic Thought and Culture, Winter, 2008 by H. Wendell Howard
 "Master of the medieval mystery" 11 June 2009 Guardian
 "That Healing Touch in a Brutal Century" New York Times. January 3, 1999

Mystery novels by series
Crime novel series
Historical novels by series
British crime novels
Historical novels
British novels adapted into television shows
Novels set in Shropshire
Novels set in the 12th century
The Anarchy
Cultural depictions of Empress Matilda
Clerical mysteries
Historical mystery novels